is a Japanese dumpling made from a fermented buckwheat dough wrapped around a stuffing of Japanese vegetables, fruit, or anko bean paste and then roasted on an iron pan. The resulting bun is then either steamed or broiled and eaten hot. Oyaki are popular and widely available in Nagano Prefecture which is famous for the dish.

Nagano's oyaki are not to be confused with Imagawayaki which is made from a light batter and is eaten as a dessert, though you can find many stores selling Imagawayaki as Oyaki.

History 
Nagano Prefecture's steep mountains and cold climate made rice cultivation difficult and produced poor yields in pre-industrial Japan. Farmers in Nagano turned to buckwheat (soba) instead. The resulting flour was then mixed with water and stuffed with local wild vegetables and seasoned with soy sauce and salt.

See also
 List of buckwheat dishes

External links 
 My Home Town and Local Food English language web page describing how oyaki are made at Oyaki Village in Ogawa Village, Nagano Prefecture.
 Oyaki Village website 

Culture in Nagano Prefecture
Japanese cuisine
Buckwheat dishes
Buddhist cuisine
Dumplings